Robert L. Richards (March 3, 1909 - June 1984) was a film screenwriter. He attended Horace Mann School (high school) and graduated from Harvard in 1932. He worked for Time magazine and the March of Time radio program and newsreel for 7 years.

Richards worked on a number of notable films of the 1940s and 1950s including Winchester '73, Johnny Stool Pigeon, and Act of Violence. His radio work included writing for the Suspense series which aired on the CBS network from 1942 until 1962. Among Richards' numerous Suspense offerings was his critically acclaimed neogothic horror thriller entitled "The House in Cypress Canyon" broadcast on December 5, 1946. Considered one of the tautest, most chilling dramas in the Suspense canon, the now classic show featured  Robert Taylor, Cathy Lewis, Hans Conried, and Howard Duff in starring roles.

Richards testified before the House Unamerican Activities Committee on September 20, 1951. He was asked about his membership in the Communist Party, and took the Fifth Amendment. His testimony was followed by that of Ann Roth Morgan Richards, his wife, who said she and Robert were married in 1949. She also took the Fifth Amendment.

Filmography

Films

Television

References

External links

American male screenwriters
1909 births
1984 deaths
20th-century American screenwriters
Harvard College alumni